Nina Mittelham (born 23 November 1996) is a German table tennis player. She clinched the women's singles titles at the 2021 Europe Top 16 Cup. In 2022, she won singles title at the WTT Lima Contender.

References

1996 births
Living people
German female table tennis players
World Table Tennis Championships medalists
21st-century German women